Pyhäjärvi is a lake in southern Finland. Although the name means in modern Finnish "holy lake", it probably meant originally "border lake". Pyhäjärvi is shaped like the letter "C" with the cities of Tampere and Nokia on the northern end, and town of Lempäälä at the southern end.

The lake is fed by the water running through the Tammerkoski rapids in the center of Tampere from the North, and by the waters from lake Vanajavesi in the South. Because of the Tammerkoski rapids, the water in Pyhäjärvi is warmer and richer in ozone than that in the northern lake, Näsijärvi, which results in the life in this lake being richer, even though the water is more polluted.

There are a number of other Pyhäjärvis in Finland and its former territories, as well.

References

External links

Kokemäenjoki basin
Lakes of Tampere